Trúc Lâm Yên Tử (竹林安子), or simply Trúc Lâm ("Bamboo Grove"), is a Vietnamese Thiền (i.e. zen) sect. It is the only native school of Buddhism in Vietnam. The school was founded by Emperor Trần Nhân Tông (1258–1308) showing influence from Confucian and Taoist philosophy. Trúc Lâm's prestige later waned as Confucianism became dominant in the royal court.

A revival was attempted by later adherents including Ngô Thì Nhậm (1746–1803) during the Tay Son dynasty. Nhậm attempted to harmonize the "Three teachings" of Buddhism, Confucianism and Taoism. 

In modern times, Zen Master Venerable Thích Thanh Từ has revived the Trúc Lâm Zen lineage by combining the teachings of the three early Patriarchs of the tradition: Trần Nhân Tông, Pháp Loa, and Huyền Quang. His efforts are brought forth from the principles of three Patriarchs whom he believes have minimal amounts of transition from traditional Chinese Buddhism. Thích Thanh Từ claims to be re-establishing the Trúc Lâm traditions but in his own way has modified it from its original ways. He wasn't much of a global influence in his earlier years of work, but in recent history has been on top of Buddhist movements on the global level. His initial work in Vietnam has now moved onwards to western civilization by getting his word across through the translation of books that he has written. He is having the most influence on today's view on Buddhism and what it means to be a Buddhist monk through the implementation of the revived religion referred to as Trúc Lâm.

References

Schools of Buddhism founded in Vietnam